Micranthes micranthidifolia is a member of the Saxifrage family with the common names lettuceleaf saxifrage, branch lettuce and brook lettuce. It grows in wet areas and mountain streams.

It is a native plant of the Great Smoky Mountains and occurs in many other parts of the southeastern United States.

References

 Horn, Cathcart, Hemmerly, Duhl, Wildflowers of Tennessee, the Ohio Valley, and the Southern Appalachians, Lone Pine Publishing, (2005) p 143,  

micranthidifolia
Flora of the Southeastern United States
Flora of the Appalachian Mountains
Plants described in 1903